Mauritius was represented at the 2006 Commonwealth Games in Melbourne, Australia by a xx-member contingent comprising xx sportspersons and xx officials.

Medals

Medalists

Silver
 Stéphan Buckland, Athletics, Men's 200 m
 Giovanni Frontin, Boxing, Lightweight (60 kg) Category
 (Louis Richard) Bruno Julie, Boxing, Bantamweight (54 kg) Category

References

Mauritius at the Commonwealth Games
Nations at the 2006 Commonwealth Games
Commonwealth Games